Sean Reynolds may refer to:
Sean K. Reynolds, game designer
Sean Reynolds (Emmerdale), a fictional character from the British soap opera Emmerdale
Sean Reynolds (soccer) (born 1990), American soccer player
Sean Reynolds (RAF officer), British air marshal
Sean Reynolds (baseball), baseball player